The Chicago, Rock Island and Pacific Depot in Marseilles, Illinois is a historic train station built in 1917. It was in operation as a rail depot until 1974. The depot was added to the U.S. National Register of Historic Places in 1995.

History
The Marseilles Chicago, Rock Island and Pacific Depot was constructed in 1917 after citizens in the city won a 40-year battle with the railroad and a U.S. circuit court ordered a new station be built. The 1917 station replaced a smaller, wooden station built in 1867. The station was in operation until 1974 and was sold to a private business owner in 1984.

Since 2016 the depot is home to the Marseilles Museum.  Several museum exhibits are dedicated to depot history.

Architecture
It has two center bays, on either side of the building, one of which functioned as a ticket office. The structure was designed and built by T. S. Peak, a Chicago builder and cast in the American Craftsman architectural style. Despite having undergone extensive interior remodeling the building retains a high degree of its exterior architectural integrity.

Historic significance
The depot was a locally significant transportation hub which facilitated the shipment of people and goods to and from Marseilles along the Rock Island and LaSalle Line, which became the Chicago, Rock Island and Pacific Railroad. The railroad, which parallels the Illinois and Michigan Canal from Chicago to Peru, brought an end to passenger service along the canal due to its success. The Chicago, Rock Island and Pacific Depot in Marseilles was added to the National Register of Historic Places on November 7, 1995.

References

External links
Chicago, Rock Island and Pacific Railroad Depot (Marseilles, Illinois), Property Information Report, Illinois Historic Preservation Agency, accessed May 16, 2008.

Depot Library of Congress records 

Former railway stations in Illinois
Historic American Engineering Record in Illinois
National Register of Historic Places in LaSalle County, Illinois
Railway stations on the National Register of Historic Places in Illinois
Marseilles
Railway stations in the United States opened in 1917
Railway stations closed in 1974
Railway stations in LaSalle County, Illinois